Mansco Hollow is a valley in Ripley County in the U.S. state of Missouri.

Mansco Hollow has the name of the local Mansco family.

References

Valleys of Ripley County, Missouri
Valleys of Missouri